Shahrak-e Kheyzan (also Romanized as Shahrak-e Kheyzān) is a village in Kuh Mareh Khami Rural District, in the Central District of Basht County, Kohgiluyeh and Boyer-Ahmad Province, Iran. At the 2006 census, its population was 137, in 36 families.

References 

Populated places in Basht County